Tamil loanwords in Ancient Greek came about due to the interactions of Mediterranean and South Indian merchants. Tamil loanwords entered the Greek language during different periods in history. Most words had to do with items of trade that were unique to South India. There is a general consensus about Tamil loanwords in Ancient Greek, while a few of the words have competing etymologies.

Early contacts
 The mainstream view is that beginnings of trade between the Mediterranean and South India can be traced back to 500 BCE when the word zingíberis (ζιγγίβερις) derived from Proto-South Dravidian cinki-ver (சிங்கிவேர்) for Ginger first appeared in Greek and thus South India may have been involved in trade with the Mediterranean centuries earlier. But there is evidence that trade between the Indian region and the Mediterranean may have been well established by 1500 BCE.  Greek lexicon contains both cultural words that are common to many languages in the general area and loanwords from various other languages. 

Greek and Tamil relationship is on firmer ground during the Ptolemaic and later Roman period from 305 BCE to 476 CE when Greek speaking merchants along with others extensively traded with Indians in general and Tamils in particular. A Pandyan king, based out of ancient Tamilaham sent embassies twice to Rome, wanting to become the Roman Emperors friend and ally. One of these reached Augustus when he was at Terracina in the eighteenth year after the death of Julius Caesar in 26 BCE and another six years afterwards in 20 BCE. Greeks were employed as mercenaries by many Tamil kings. There were also Greek settlements along the coasts of western and eastern Tamilaham. The Greek–South Indian relationships were impactful enough that a Greek play Charition mime was written with a Dravidian language presumed to be a coastal dialect of either Kannada or Tulu, speaker included in the play dated to 2nd century CE.

Date of borrowings
It is difficult to exactly date the lexiconic borrowing of Tamil words in Ancient Greek.  A few words such as taôs for peacock, agálokhon for Eaglewood and óruza for rice have similar words in Biblical Hebrew and other West Asian languages. Some of the Tamil loanwords in Biblical Hebrew, which are common with Ancient Greek are found at its earliest stage around 1000 BCE to 500 BCE. Franklin Southworth dates the borrowing of the word zingíberis (ζιγγίβερις) derived from Proto-South Dravidian cinki-ver (சிங்கிவேர்) to 500 BCE, where as Kamil Zvelebil derives it from Old Tamil form Inchi-Ver (இஞ்சிவேர்). But a word for cinnamon used by Ctesias in his Indica, namely karpion borrowed from a Tamil word for Cinnamon can be safely dated to 400 BCE. Chaim Rabin dates the Greek word for rice, óruza/όρυζα borrowed via Semitic words for rice, ultimately derived from Tamil to 400 BCE.

Known loan words

Notes

References

Cited literature

 
 
 
 
 
 
 
 
 
 
 
 
 
 
 
 

G
T
T